State Road 111 (SR 111) in the U.S. State of Indiana is a rural two-lane highway which passes between New Boston and New Albany in the far southern portion of the state.  It has existed since 1935. Some of the highway was decommissioned in October 2012 and more was decommissioned in January 2013.

Route description

The southern terminus of State Road 111 is at a dead end on the shores of the Ohio River, near the small community of New Boston. It continues to follow the river toward Bridgeport. It continues north, entering downtown New Albany. From there, it turns to meet at its current northern terminus at the intersection between Main Street and State Street.

History

Before 1935, SR 111 was known as SR 133.  When U.S. Route 33 (US 33) commissioned in Indiana, SR 33 was decommissioned.  SR 133 followed the same route as SR 111. In October 2012, the portion of SR 111 in Clark County was turned over to the county, with the Floyd County portion turned over to the county in January 2013.

Major intersections

See also
 Indiana State Road 11

References

External links

111
Transportation in Harrison County, Indiana
Transportation in Floyd County, Indiana
Transportation in Clark County, Indiana